Lower Mill or Opposition Mill is a Grade II* listed smock mill at Dalham, Suffolk, England which has been preserved.

History

Lower Mill or Opposition Mill was built in the 1790s by a Mr Ruffle. The sails were blown off in 1802. She was working until 1926 and by 1935 was in need of repairs. These were completed in 1938 but the mill again deteriorated until it was purchased in 1972 by Frank Farrow and restoration began with the intention of returning the mill to working order, assisted by grants from Suffolk County Council and the Historic Buildings Council for England. The windmill's restoration work was carried out by Gormley and Goodman Engineers of Warwickshire between 1979 and 1980. (see also Bromham Watermill and Stevington Windmill, Bedfordshire.

Description

Lower Mill is a three-storey smock mill on a single-storey brick base. It has a beehive cap with a gallery which was winded by a fantail. They drove three pairs of French Burr millstones which are mounted on a hurst frame on the first floor.

Millers

William Ruffle 1804-55
George Moore 1855-75
Abraham Simpson 1875-85
Joseph Tabraham 1875-
John Tabraham 1875-
Josiah Tabraham
John Tabraham
Lewis Tabraham
Elijah Rutterford 1904
Charles Kerridge 1908
Turner -1926
Reference for above:-

External links
Windmill World webpage on Dalham Mill.

References

Industrial buildings completed in the 18th century
Windmills in Suffolk
Smock mills in England
Grade II* listed buildings in Suffolk
Grinding mills in the United Kingdom
Forest Heath
Grade II* listed windmills
Octagonal buildings in the United Kingdom